Han Dae-yoon (born 12 August 1988) is a South Korean sports shooter. He competed in the men's 25 metre rapid fire pistol event at the 2020 Summer Olympics.

References

External links
 

1988 births
Living people
South Korean male sport shooters
Olympic shooters of South Korea
Shooters at the 2020 Summer Olympics
Place of birth missing (living people)